Fern Bay is the southernmost suburb of the Port Stephens local government area in the Hunter Region of New South Wales, Australia. It is located just north of Stockton, which is the only suburb of Newcastle that lies north of the Hunter River and to the east of the north arm of the Hunter River at the entrance to Fullerton Cove, a large body of water. To the east is the Tasman Sea. Despite the suburb only being  in a direct line from Newcastle, the need to cross the Hunter River results in Fern Bay being  by road from the centre of the city.

The area is undergoing a residential expansion program with a large development being built between Nelson Bay Road and Stockton Beach on land formerly used as a military weapons range.

History 
The Worimi people are the traditional owners of the Port Stephens area.

Population 
83.3% of people were born in Australia. The next most common country of birth was England at 3.8%. 91.7% of people spoke only English at home. The most common responses for religion were Anglican 26.2%, No Religion 26.0% and Catholic 21.3%.

Notes

References

External links 
 Fern Bay at Australian Explorer
 

Suburbs of Port Stephens Council